Florida is a state located in the Southern United States. There are 267 cities, 123 towns, and 21 villages in the U.S. state of Florida, a total of 411 municipalities. They are distributed across 67 counties, in addition to 66 county governments. Jacksonville has the only consolidated city–county government in the state, so there is no Duval County government. However, smaller municipal governments exist within the consolidated municipality, e.g., Baldwin and the Jacksonville Beaches.  All but two of Florida's county seats are municipalities (the exceptions are Crawfordville, county seat of rural Wakulla County; and East Naples, county seat of Collier County).

Municipalities in Florida may be called cities, towns, or villages, but there is no legal distinction between the different terms. As of the 2010 U.S. Census, more than 10 million Floridians, 55% of the state's total population of 18,801,310, lived in municipalities. The remainder lived in unincorporated areas. However, 94% of the population lives in metropolitan areas. Of the remaining 6%, many live in smaller cities and towns, thus the actual number of residents living in truly rural areas is small. There are ten counties in the state with just one municipality and ten counties with only two.

In 1822, St. Augustine and Pensacola became the first municipalities to incorporate. The most recent incorporation was Westlake in 2016.

The formation and dissolution of municipalities is governed by Chapter 165 of the Florida Statutes. All Florida municipalities must be operated under a municipal charter approved by a majority of the registered voters in the geographic area of the municipality, which must be confirmed by the state legislature through special legislation.

The largest cities in Florida (population over 200,000) utilize the strong mayor–council form of government. The mayor typically appoints a chief administrative officer who performs the same function as a city manager which is utilized by 70% of Florida's municipalities, whose mayors are primarily symbolic and ceremonial.

Incorporated cities, towns, and villages

Note: The table of contents only applies when the list is sorted by place name. 
"Rank" refers to the relative position of a municipality on a list ranked from 1 to 411 by population.
"Year" refers to the first time a place name was incorporated. If a community was incorporated as a Town, then subsequently incorporated as a City, the earliest date is provided.
Left mouse click on the up/down arrows to sort the list by that column.

See also

 List of counties in Florida
 List of places in Florida
 List of former municipalities in Florida
 List of census-designated places in Florida

References

Bibliography

External links

 Florida League of Cities
 US Geological Survey: Geographic names in Florida
 

 
 
 
 
 
Florida geography-related lists
Florida
Florida
Florida